Jelieh or Jalieh may refer to:
 Jalieh, Ahvaz
 Jelieh, Bavi
 Jalieh, Shushtar